Roger Federer's 2013 tennis season officially began on 14 January at the start of the 2013 Australian Open. This season saw Federer suffer a considerable decline in form, dropping five places to number 7 in the world, his lowest ranking in 11 years, and seeing his run of 36 consecutive grand slam quarterfinals ended by a second round defeat at Wimbledon. This year also marked the first time since 2002 where Federer did not reach a major final. His only title win of the season was a victory at the Gerry Weber Open in Halle, an ATP 250 event.

The decline in form can be largely attributed to the severe back injuries Federer suffered for much of the season, hampering his play from March through October. He first injured his back in the early rounds of Indian Wells and then re-injured it in the quarterfinals of Hamburg.

Year summary

Australian Open and early hard court season

Australian Open
Federer kicked off his 2013 season with an appearance at the Australian Open, where he finished in the semifinals last year. Federer began his campaign against Frenchman Benoît Paire in the first round, and swept him in straight sets. He defeated long-time rival Nikolay Davydenko in the second round in straight sets, and faced Australian Bernard Tomic in the third round. After Federer converted on a break point in the first game and held to win the set, Tomic attempted to level the game, saving six break points and bringing the second set to a tiebreak, in which he had an early lead, but Federer overcame the deficit and won the tiebreak. Federer then broke Tomic twice and gave up only one game in the third set, winning the match in under two hours. Federer defeated big serving Canadian Milos Raonic in the fourth round in straight sets, having not dropped neither a set nor a service game through the fourth round. With the win, he also extended his record of consecutive Grand Slam quarterfinal appearances to 35, a run which extends back to the 2004 Wimbledon Championships. Federer faced Jo-Wilfried Tsonga in the quarterfinals, where he and Tsonga traded breaks in the first set and brought the set to a tiebreak, which he won. Tsonga took advantage of Federer's unforced errors in the second set, breaking his serve and holding to level out the match at one set all. The third set saw Federer and Tsonga again trading breaks and playing a tiebreak, which Federer won. Tsonga recovered from a triple break point in the fourth set, and broke Federer's serve and held the lead to bring the match to a fifth set, where Federer broke Tsonga and won the match after four match points and three and a half hours. With his win, Federer advanced to his tenth straight semifinal at the Australian Open. Federer played Andy Murray in the semifinals, and found himself down one set after Murray took advantage of Federer's poor first serves to break Federer's serve and hold for the lead. The second set went to a tiebreak, which Federer won after capitalizing on some mistakes from Murray. Murray then came back in the third set, and, with the help of two line calls that went in his favor, broke Federer and held to regain a one-set lead. Federer held an early lead in the fourth set after breaking Murray, but Murray broke back on an unforced error from Federer. Momentum then shifted in favor of Murray, who came close to winning the match, but Federer forced the set to go to a tiebreak, which he won. In the fifth set, Federer was unable to respond to aces and winners from Murray, giving up two break points and losing the match in four hours.

Rotterdam Open
Federer next played at the ABN AMRO World Tennis Tournament in Rotterdam, entering as defending champion. He played Grega Žemlja of Slovenia in the first round, and blew past him, winning in straight sets in less than an hour. He next played wildcard Thiemo de Bakker of the Netherlands, and defeated him in straight sets in just over an hour. He played Frenchman Julien Benneteau in the quarterfinals, and found himself down one set after unforced errors led to his serve being broken. Federer then fought to secure the second set, but ultimately failed after missing a break point opportunity.

Dubai Tennis Championships
Following the loss of his Rotterdam title, Federer next attempted to defend his title at the Dubai Tennis Championships in Dubai. He faced Tunisian wildcard Malek Jaziri in the first round, and dropped the first set after Jaziri secured his first and only break point in the match. Federer then took charge of the match, winning twelve of the next fourteen games to secure a win. In the second round, Federer played Marcel Granollers of Spain, and broke Granollers' serve once in each set en route to a straight-sets victory. Federer then played perennial rival Nikolay Davydenko in the third round, and flew past him in less than an hour to a second straight-sets victory. He lost to Tomáš Berdych in the semifinals in a close match, while blowing three match points in the second set tiebreak.

Indian Wells Masters
At the first Masters 1000 series event of the year, Federer once again entered as defending champion at Indian Wells. After receiving a bye in the first round, he faced Denis Istomin of Uzbekistan in the second round and defeated him in straight sets, completing the match in just under an hour. He played Croatian Ivan Dodig in the third round and advanced again in straight sets, dropping only four games en route to a victory in just over an hour. Federer next faced Swiss compatriot Stanislas Wawrinka. He won the match in three tight sets, nearly losing the match after Wawrinka broke in the third set. However, Federer held on to win the last set, and found perennial foe Rafael Nadal in the quarterfinals. Federer, however, entered the match having suffered a back injury in the previous round and was defeated in straight sets. He then continued with his pre-planned decision to take a two-month break from the sport, skipping the mandatory Masters 1000 tournament in Miami under an exception from the ATP, which allows older players to relax their schedules, and the non-mandatory Masters 1000 tournament in Monte Carlo.

Spring clay court season and French Open

Madrid Open
Federer next competed on clay at the Mutua Madrid Open, where he was the defending champion. Federer played Radek Štěpánek of the Czech Republic in the second round after a bye in the first round, and defeated him in straight sets. Federer then met Kei Nishikori of Japan in the third round. In the first set, Federer allowed Nishikori to convert on a break point opportunity, and Nishikori held the advantage to take the set. Federer came back in the second set, relying on strong shot-making to win five straight games and level the match at one set all. Federer's serve faltered in the third, and uncharacteristic errors from Federer, as well as strong play from Nishikori, meant that the Japanese number 1 defeated Federer for the first time in his career. This was Federer's earliest exit at the event since 2003, when the event was held as the Stuttgart Masters.

Italian Open
Federer played at the Italian Open in Rome, where he finished in the semifinals the previous year. After a bye in the first round, Federer played Potito Starace in the second round, dropping only seven points on serve and breaking Starace four times en route to a victory in straight sets in 51 minutes. He faced Gilles Simon of France in the third round, and raced past Simon in similar style, winning in just over an hour after again dropping only three games. Federer played Jerzy Janowicz of Poland in the quarterfinals. In the first set, Federer and Janowicz traded games until Federer found a late break point, which he converted to take the set. Janowicz broke Federer in the first game of the second set and held to serve for the set, but Federer broke back and won the tiebreak to clinch the match. He played Benoît Paire of France in the semifinals. Paire held an early lead in the first before Federer broke back and won a tight tiebreak. Federer then broke early in the second set and held to win in straight sets. He played Rafael Nadal in his first final of the year, but fell short against a hot-handed Nadal, committing multiple unforced errors and having his serve broken five times en route to a loss in straight sets in just over an hour.

French Open
Federer next competed at the French Open, where he finished in the semifinals the previous year. He played qualifier Pablo Carreño-Busta of Spain in the opening round, and won in straight sets, converting all seven of his break points to move into the second round, where he swept past qualifier Somdev Devvarman of India, dropping only five games en route to a victory in straight sets. He faced Frenchman Julien Benneteau, who had beaten him earlier in the year, in the third round. After a break of serve by Benneteau to start off the match, Federer rebounded and  took the first set. Benneteau tried to make inroads on Federer's serve, but Federer continued to dominate, winning the next two sets to move to the fourth round, where he faced Frenchman Gilles Simon. Federer won the first set comfortably, but Simon began to fight back. Federer lost his rhythm after he fell on the baseline in the second set, and Simon capitalized to take the set and level the match at one set all. Simon took advantage of more unforced errors from Federer and won the third set, but Federer found his rhythm again and broke Simon's serve in the fourth, holding to level the match. Federer then secured an early break in the fifth and held to win the match, becoming the fourth person to have 900 wins on the ATP World Tour. He played Jo-Wilfried Tsonga in the quarterfinals, where, after a decent start, Federer lost an early break advantage to Tsonga, and Tsonga broke again to take the first set. The next two sets saw Tsonga take a foothold on the match as numerous errors plagued Federer. Tsonga eventually won the match in straight sets.

Grass court season and Wimbledon

Halle Open
Federer played at the Gerry Weber Open in Halle, where he was the finalist last year. He played German wildcard Cedrik-Marcel Stebe in the second round. Though Federer struggled with his serve and made quite a few errors, including one in the first set which allowed Stebe to break his serve, Federer dominated most of the match and won in straight sets, marking his fortieth win at the Gerry Weber Open. He played German wildcard Mischa Zverev in the quarterfinals and swept past Zverev, not allowing him any games and breaking him a total of six times en route to a victory in forty minutes. Federer achieved his second double bagel of his career, his first since he double-bageled Gastón Gaudio at the 2005 Tennis Masters Cup. He then faced defending champion Tommy Haas in the semifinal. In a tight first set, Federer gave up a break point in the sixth game of the set, and Haas held the lead to win the set. The second set saw Federer win an early break point and level the match at one set all. Federer then broke Haas to love and held the lead to win the match. In the final, Federer played Russian Mikhail Youzhny. After wasted break point opportunities and unforced errors led to Youzhny edging Federer in the first set tiebreak, Federer improved his game and won the match to claim his first title of the season, tying John McEnroe for the third-most number of ATP titles won by a male player in the Open Era.

Wimbledon
Federer played at the Wimbledon Championships, where he was defending champion and vying to match Rafael Nadal's record of 8 titles at a single Grand Slam tournament, which Nadal had just achieved at the French Open two weeks earlier.  Federer played Victor Hănescu of Romania in the first round, and dropped only five games en route to a straight-sets win in just over an hour. He played 116th-ranked Sergiy Stakhovsky of Ukraine in the second round, and had a one-set lead before dropping the next three sets and losing the match, unable to hold leads and convert on crucial points.  The loss ended Federer's record streak of 36 consecutive Grand Slam quarterfinal appearances.  This also marked his earliest loss at a Grand Slam tournament since the 2003 French Open, his first loss to a player ranked outside of the top 100 since losing to Richard Gasquet in 2005 (ranked 101st at the time).  With Rafael Nadal's loss in the first round, this also was the first time ever that, when both of them were entered in a Grand Slam, that neither have made it to the second week.  All of this, coupled with a slew of other player withdrawals, retirements, and upsets have led that day to be referred to as Black Wednesday.

Summer clay court season
Federer added two outdoor clay events to his schedule before the US Open hard court season begins.

German Open
Federer played at the German Open Tennis Championships in Hamburg as a wildcard. Federer won the title in Hamburg four times when it was an ATP Masters Series event, but did not play there since 2008, when he was a finalist. Federer announced before his first round match in Hamburg that he was changing his racquet for the second time in his career (the first change occurred in 2002 just prior to the tournament in Hamburg of that year), upgrading from a 90-inch frame to a 98-inch frame. His first match was against German Daniel Brands, and he earned his first victory with his new racquet, rallying against strong play by Brands after dropping the first set. He next played Jan Hájek of the Czech Republic, and defeated him in straight sets after wasting many break and match points. He played Florian Mayer in the quarterfinals, and dropped his first set against Mayer in a tough three-set victory. In the semifinals, he played qualifier Federico Delbonis of Argentina for the first time, but lost in straight set, failing to convert break and set points as Delbonis took advantage to win both set tiebreaks.

Swiss Open
Federer next played at the Swiss Open. It was the first time Federer had participated in the Swiss Open since 2004. The tournament honored Federer's return by presenting him with a Swiss cow named Desiree. Despite the excitement over his return to the event, he was defeated in his opening match by Daniel Brands, his first opening-match loss since Rome in 2010. After the loss, Federer revealed that he had suffered a serious back injury several days before in Hamburg, and that he had taken anti-inflammatories and had been unable to practice.

US Open Series and US Open

Cincinnati Masters
After withdrawing from the Rogers Cup, Federer played at the Western & Southern Open in Cincinnati, where he was the champion last year. Following a first-round bye, Federer played German Philipp Kohlschreiber in the second round. After speeding through the opening set, Federer found some trouble against Kohlschreiber in the second set, but managed to convert his second match point during the set tiebreak, keeping his winning streak against Kohlschreiber alive with a straight sets win. He played Tommy Haas in the third round, and came close to losing after Haas held a one-set, one-break advantage. Federer rallied to force a third set and won the match in under two hours. Federer next played Rafael Nadal in the quarterfinals. He broke Nadal late in the first set, playing fast and aggressive tennis with sharply angled, clean and powerful groundstrokes off both wings and frequent attacks at the net. He had opportunities to threaten Nadal on Nadal's serve in the second set, but this went awry, as Nadal continued to fight and as Federer began to rack up unforced errors. Federer's serve folded at the end of the second set and the start of the third, but he saved four match points on Nadal's serve before a wide forehand from Nadal on match point went unchallenged by Federer. Federer fell down the rankings again to No. 7, his lowest in over a decade.

US Open
At the US Open in New York Federer played Slovenian Grega Žemlja in the first round, and won in straight sets after a lapse of concentration resulted in a drop of his serve in the third set. He next played Carlos Berlocq of Argentina in the second round, and swept him in straight sets, dropping only six games en route to a win in just over one and a half hours. He next played Adrian Mannarino in the third round, and won in similar fashion, holding his serve and dropping only five games in the match. In a surprise, Federer then lost to Tommy Robredo, a player he had beaten ten straight times, in straight sets in another error strewn display.

Asian Swing

Shanghai Masters
Federer's first post-US Open tournament was at the Shanghai Masters. He defeated Andreas Seppi in the second round in straight sets, but dropped his next match in the third round against Gaël Monfils in three sets. The loss marked only his second defeat against the Frenchman.

European Indoor Season

Swiss Indoors
Federer next played in the Swiss Indoors. He defeated Adrian Mannarino in the first round in straight sets, and then came back from a one-set deficit against Denis Istomin in under two hours. In the quarterfinal, Roger Federer faced Grigor Dimitrov, nicknamed "Baby Federer", for the first time. Dimitrov was defeated in straight sets, but Federer had to recover from a service break down and force a tie-break decision in the second set. In the semifinal round, Federer defeated Vasek Pospisil in a very tight three-setter. After winning the first set comfortably by breaking Pospisil's serve twice, Federer served for the match in the second set but squandered the opportunity. Then, Federer's serve was broken early in the deciding set, but he managed to return the service break and was able to serve for the match successfully at his second chance. Federer faced Juan Martín del Potro for the title, in a repeat of the previous year's final that saw del Potro emerge again victorious. He fell short again in another three-set battle against the Argentine. Despite the loss, the match saw Federer display significant improvement in form after a sluggish run to the final.

Paris Masters
Federer next played in Paris at the BNP Paribas Masters, knowing that he would qualify for the ATP World Tour Finals if he won his opening match against Kevin Anderson.  With his win over Anderson, he became the sixth player to qualify (seventh if including the injured Andy Murray) for the Finals.  He made it to the semifinals by subsequently beating Philipp Kohlschreiber and Juan Martín del Potro, the latter whom he faced less than a week earlier in the final in Basel.  His win over del Potro was only his second of the season over a top-10 player, first since January, and only top-5 win thus far.  Federer met Novak Djokovic in the semifinals for their 30th career meeting, where he ultimately lost in three sets.

ATP World Tour Finals
Federer entered the ATP World Tour Finals as the No. 6 seed and was drawn in group B with Novak Djokovic, Juan Martín del Potro, and Richard Gasquet. Before the tournament began, Federer received three ATP World Tour Awards: the Fans' Favourite Award for a record eleventh consecutive time, the Stefan Edberg Sportsmanship award for a record ninth time, and the Arthur Ashe Humanitarian Award for a record-tying second time. Federer played his first round-robin match against Djokovic, only 3 days after their last match in Paris, and he again lost in three sets. Federer had not lost an opening match in the World Tour Finals since 2008. Federer then defeated Gasquet in straight sets. With Novak Djokovic having won the group just after two round-robin matches, Federer played his last round-robin match against del Potro. It was the third match between them in the last three weeks of the season. Federer won, but not without saving a breakpoint, and booked a place in the semifinals against Group A winner Rafael Nadal, who had won all his three round-robin matches and successfully clinched the No. 1 ranking for the 2013 season. Federer lost the semifinal match in straight sets, only managing to break Nadal's serve once in the first set. It was Federer's fourth consecutive defeat against Nadal in the 2013 season. At the end of the tournament, Federer overtook Tomas Berdych in the singles rankings and finished the season as world No. 6, his lowest since 2002.

All matches

Singles matches

Doubles matches

Tournament schedule

Singles schedule
Federer's 2013 singles tournament schedule is as follows:

Doubles schedule

Yearly records

Head-to-head matchups
Roger Federer had a  match win–loss record in the 2013 season. The following list is ordered by number of wins:

 Nikolay Davydenko 2–0
 Tommy Haas 2–0
 Denis Istomin 2–0
 Philipp Kohlschreiber 2–0
 Adrian Mannarino 2–0
 Benoît Paire 2–0
 Gilles Simon 2–0
 Grega Žemlja 2–0
 Juan Martín del Potro 2–1
 Kevin Anderson 1–0
 Thiemo de Bakker 1–0
 Carlos Berlocq 1–0
 Pablo Carreño-Busta 1–0
 Somdev Devvarman 1–0
 Grigor Dimitrov 1–0
 Ivan Dodig 1–0
 Richard Gasquet 1–0
 Marcel Granollers 1–0
 Jan Hájek 1–0
 Victor Hănescu 1–0
 Jerzy Janowicz 1–0
 Malek Jaziri 1–0
 Florian Mayer 1–0
 Vasek Pospisil 1–0
 Milos Raonic 1–0
 Andreas Seppi 1–0
 Potito Starace 1–0
 Cedrik-Marcel Stebe 1–0
 Radek Štěpánek 1–0
 Bernard Tomic 1–0
 Stanislas Wawrinka 1–0
 Mikhail Youzhny 1–0
 Mischa Zverev 1–0
 Julien Benneteau 1–1
 Daniel Brands 1–1
 Jo-Wilfried Tsonga 1–1
 Tomas Berdych 0–1
 Federico Delbonis 0–1
 Gaël Monfils 0–1
 Andy Murray 0–1
 Kei Nishikori 0–1
 Tommy Robredo 0–1
 Sergiy Stakhovsky 0–1
 Novak Djokovic 0–2
 Rafael Nadal 0–4

Finals

Singles: 3 (1–2)

Earnings

 Figures in United States dollars (USD) unless noted.

Awards
Stefan Edberg Sportsmanship Award
Record ninth award in career (third consecutive)
ATPWorldTour.com Fans' Favourite
Record eleventh consecutive award in career
Arthur Ashe Humanitarian Award
Record-tying second award in career

See also
2013 ATP World Tour
2013 Rafael Nadal tennis season
2013 Novak Djokovic tennis season
2013 Andy Murray tennis season

References

External links
  
 ATP tour profile

2013 Roger Federer tennis season
Federer tennis season
2013 in Swiss tennis
2013 in Swiss sport